Robert Livingstone Aldridge (September 7, 1954 in Richmond, VA) is an American composer, professor, and current Head of Composition professor, and former Director of Music at the Mason Gross School of the Arts at Rutgers University. He has written over eighty works for orchestra, opera, musical theater, dance, and various chamber ensembles that have been performed in the United States, Europe, and Japan. He is widely known for his opera Elmer Gantry, based on Sinclair Lewis's 1927 novel of the same name. which was completed in 2007 and won Best Engineered Album (Classical) and Best Contemporary Classical Composition in the 54th Annual Grammy Awards.

Biography
Aldridge holds degrees in both composition and English literature. Aldridge received a bachelor's degree in English literature from the University of Wisconsin-Madison, a master's degree in composition from the New England Conservatory of Music, and a doctorate in composition from the Yale School of Music in 2000.

In November 2007, an opera titled Elmer Gantry by Robert Aldridge and with a libretto by Herschel Garfein premiered in the James K. Polk Theater in Nashville.

Parables also with a libretto by Herschel Garfein was a work commissioned by the Topeka Symphony. It premiered in May 2010.

He was professor of composition at Montclair State University in New Jersey. He was appointed director of the music department of the Mason Gross School of the Arts at Rutgers University in 2012.

Robert Aldridge currently lives in Montclair, New Jersey with his wife Paula Stark, a landscape artist. They have one daughter, Micaela Aldridge (b.1994).

Honors and awards
He has received numerous fellowships and awards for his music from the National Academy of Recording Arts and Sciences, the Guggenheim Foundation, the American Academy of Arts and Letters, National Endowment for the Arts, the New York Foundation for the Arts, the Pennsylvania Council on the Arts, the Massachusetts Artist's Foundation, the Lila Wallace Reader's Digest Fund, Meet the Composer, the American Symphony Orchestra League, the New Jersey Council on the Arts and the Geraldine R. Dodge Foundation.

Works

References

External links
 Official website
 Rutgers University profile
 'Ep. 88: Robert Aldridge, composer' Interview by Tigran Arakelyan

1954 births
American male classical composers
American classical composers
American opera composers
Male opera composers
Living people
Rutgers University faculty
20th-century American composers
20th-century classical composers
21st-century American composers
21st-century classical composers
University of Wisconsin–Madison College of Letters and Science alumni
New England Conservatory alumni
Yale School of Music alumni
Montclair State University faculty
Musicians from Richmond, Virginia
Classical musicians from Virginia
20th-century American male musicians
21st-century American male musicians